The Liberty Aviation Museum is located in Port Clinton, Ohio, United States, adjacent to the Erie–Ottawa International Airport.

History
The Liberty Aviation Museum owns a 1928 Ford 5-AT Tri-motor, currently operating with the Experimental Aircraft Association for the Fly the Ford tour. The Tri-Motor Heritage Foundation is also based at the museum where some volunteers of the EAA Chapter 1247 are restoring an Island Airlines 1929 5-AT Ford Trimotor.

Also at the Liberty Aviation Museum, is the Tin Goose Diner.  The diner is a vintage 1950s O'Mahoney diner, originally operating in Jim Thorpe, Pennsylvania under the name of Sunrise Diner.  The Diner became a permanent addition to the Liberty Aviation Museum in 2012.

In 2015, the museum won a lawsuit against Treasure Cove Marina, arguing that they were overcharged for the restoration of their PT-boat.

Collection

Aircraft
 Consolidated PBY-6A Catalina 46662
 Ford 5-AT-B Trimotor 5-AT-8 "City of Port Clinton"/"City of Wichita"
 North American TB-25N Mitchell 44-86777 "Georgie's Gal" – It was previously known as "Martha Jean".
 Grumman TBM-3E Avenger 91436
 North American Harvard IV MM53844 – This aircraft was retired from the Italian Air Force in the 1970s, is painted in Royal Canadian Air Force colors, and is not owned by the museum.

Watercraft
 PT-728 MTB Vosper Torpedo Boat (under restoration)
 PT-724 MTB Vosper Torpedo Boat (awaiting restoration)

See also
List of aerospace museums

References

External links
 YouTube video of museum
 Winged Victory – Ohio Magazine

Aerospace museums in Ohio
Museums in Ottawa County, Ohio